Quinton is a surname or a masculine given name.

The English surname and given name may refer to the place name Quinton, from Old English cwen "queen" or cwene "woman" and tun "farmstead, estate". The French surname Quinton [kɛ̃tɔ̃] is a common surname and a former given name. It is a variant form of Quenton [kɑ̃tɔ̃], itself from Quentin, Quintin with the usual replacement of the suffix -in (such as in the surnames Quintard, Quintier) by -on, commonly used in the French given names (e. g. Marion, Yvon) and surnames (e.g. Creton, Crinon, Bricon, etc.)

Given name

Sports
Quinton Andrews, American football player
Quinton Bell, American football player
Quinton Bohanna (born 1999), American football player
Quinton Byfield (born 2002), Canadian ice hockey player
Quinton de Kock, South African cricketer
Quinton Boatswain, Montserratian cricketer
Quinton Ferrell, American basketball coach
Quinton Flowers, American football player
Quinton Fortune, South African footballer
Quinton Hooker (born 1995), American basketball player in the Israeli Basketball Premier League
Quinton Knight, American football player
Quinton "Rampage" Jackson, American mixed martial artist
Quinton Patton (born 1990), American football player
Quinton Rose (born 1998), American basketball player

Others
Quinton Flynn, American voice actor
Quinton Kyle Hoover (born 1996), American YouTuber

Surname
A. R. Quinton (1853–1934), English watercolour artist
René Quinton (1866–1925), French naturalist and aviation pioneer
Sophie Quinton (born 1976), French actress
Anthony Quinton (1925–2010), British philosopher
Harold Quinton (c. 1899–1969), American business executive

References

English-language masculine given names
Given names originating from a surname